Stadttheater Magdeburg was the municipal theatre of Magdeburg, Germany. It was opened in 1878, was at times of national importance for operas, and was destroyed during World War II.

History

Building 
Between 1873 and 1876, a new municipal theatre was built on the site of the previously demolished fortifications on Kaiserstraße. The client was a joint-stock company which had been founded specifically for this purpose. Richard Lucae, the director of the Bauakademie, was responsible for the planning. The stage machinery was built by the E. Schwerdtfeger company from Darmstadt, which also worked for  Wagner's Bayreuth Festspielhaus.

The theatre seated 1200 people. The opening took place on 6 May 1876, with Goethe's Egmont.

Friedrich Schwemer, 1876–1877 
The first theater manager (Intendant), and also chief director (Oberregisseur) was Friedrich Schwemer. The theatre was three-part: opera, operetta and plays. The program of the first season was mostly conservative, playing Weber's Der Freischütz, Shakespeare's The Taming of the Shrew, and Beethoven' Fidelio, among others, including a total of 19 operas. The only risk-taking performance was Bjørnstjerne Bjørnson's play En fallit, resulting in a financial fiasco. Schwemer had to file bankruptcy and was dismissed.

Ludwig Ubrich, 1877–1882 
Ludwig Ubrich tried to run the theatre economically sound, with simpler productions. Efforts were made to have the town take over the theatre.

Adolf Varena, 1882–1891 
Adolf Varena staged large productions including works by Wagner, exclusively with the company's own ensemble. In 1890, the town of Magdeburg became the owner of the property, and leased the theatre for 30 years. Mayor  became chairman of the administrative committee. In 1891, Varena moved to the Stadttheater Königsberg in Königsberg, which he directed until his death.

Arno Cabisius, 1891–1907 
Arno Cabisius continued the theatre's artistic rise, presenting a production of Wagner's Der Ring des Nibelungen cycle, and a cycle of Mozart operas, gaining national attention and positive press reviews. In 1901, a May Festival was run to celebrate the 25th anniversary. In 1897, the orchestra also became municipal. Cabisius died in March 1907. His widow, Baroness Elisabeth von Fels (1845–1936), whose first marriage was to Prince Paul von Thurn und Taxis, continued his job until the end of the 1907/08 season.

Carl Coßmann, 1908–1912 
Carl Coßmann met financial difficulties, and the theatre declined, partly due to the newly opened Centraltheater. The director of plays, Heinrich Vogeler, gave more prominence to that part. In 1912, bankruptcy was filed.

Heinrich Hagin, 1912–1913 
Heinrich Hagin succeeded as director, but never dropped his positions at both the Stadttheater in Karlsruhe and the Berlin Kroll Opera House, and stayed only for two years.

Heinrich Vogeler, 1913–1930 

The former director of play Heinrich Vogeler was offered the position, the first to get a regular salary. cult legacy. His first season, with a focus on operas by Verdi and Wagner, was a success, with guest singers from great opera houses.

The beginning of the First World War caused considerable problems. The 2014 season offered many national-conservative plays (Das eiserne Kreuz, Lieb Vaterland, magst ruhig sein and Das Volk in Waffen), but still works by authors from now hostile countries (Shakespeare, Verdi and Puccini. The plays were replaced a years later by classical plays by Hebbel, Grillparzer and Ibsen, but not the expressionist plays performed elsewhere at the same time.

Vogeler significantly lowered ticket prices and the number of soloists, because attendance declined. In the summer of 1917, he leased the Viktoriatheater as a second venue, increasing flexibility. The most important artistic event during this period was the first performance of Wagner's Parsifal at the house in April 1920.

The same years, the town of Magdebuurg took over running the theatre, organised as the Städtische Bühnen Magdeburg, including the Viktoria-Theater and the Wilhelm-Theater. Mayor  was the chairman of the theatre committee. Vogeler reorganise the parts, playing opera mostly in the main venue. The world economic crisis led to considerable problems. When the town tried to cut its funding, Vogeler who was not ready to lower artistic standards, resigned on 22 January 1930.

Egon Neudegg, 1930–1932 
Egon Neudegg was put a special emphasis on operetta, which for the first time formed its own ensemble. It was played at the entral-Theater, now also affiliated to the municipal theatre. Neudegg achieved a short-term increase in audience, but in the long run, it was a financial failure. In 1932, the Centraltheater was separated from the municipal theatre again, and Neudegg resigned.

Hellmuth Götze, 1932–1933 
 was able to achieve a high artistic level in a few months, and also installed a pricing system leading to economic stability. He ran into conflict with the growing National Socialist influence. On the occasion of a performance of Kaiser's  play Der Silbersee, Götze was accused by the Nazis of "Bolshevisation". In the Magdeburg elections on 12 March 1933, the NSDAP achieved the absolute majority in the city council.

Fritz Landsittel, 1933 
Fritz Landsittel was a NSDAP party member, who finished the season Götze had planned, but cancelling works by Jewish composer Jacques Offenbach, and forcing Kapellmeister Jean-Siegfried Blumann to leave. Landsittel was dismissed after three months due to human and artistic concerns.

Edgar Klitsch, 1933–1934 
, appointed on 11 July, lost quality and importance. Many former employees were no longer allowed to work, others left the town and went to other stages. Klitsch also left Magdeburg at the beginning of 1934 and became director in Königsberg.

Erich Böhlke, 1934–1939 
The independent Erich Böhlke was a professional who developed the theatre to one of the most important music centres in Germany. He founded a municipal choir of 300 people. The stage performances were subject to the censure; performance plans had to be approved by Berlin.

Kurt Ehrlich, 1939–1945 
In 1939, Kurt Ehrlich, a party and SS member, became director, while Böhlke remained as Generalmusikdirektor. At the beginning of the Second World War, the Reich Ministry of Public Enlightenment and Propaganda announced that the Magdeburg theatre was considered to be of state importance, and that the 1939/40 season was to be held. It was difficult, due to many ensemble members being drafted, and increasing air raid alarms. Only short works were played, beginning already at 6pm. A bunker was built directly in front of the theatre.

On 1 September 1944, all German theaters were closed. The last performance after 68 years was Mozart's Figaro on 31 August 1944. During the later air raids, the main building was badly hit and destroyed.

After 1945 
The ruins remained, until they were dynamited in 1958. A park was created on the site. After the 1989 German reunification, the area was newly developed, with only the new street name "Am Alten Theater" (At the old theatre) reminding of the former municipal theatre.

Theater Magdeburg plays at an opera house on Universitätsplatz and a theatre on Otto-v.-Guericke-Straße.

Further reading 
 Jürgen Goldammer: Theaterruine: Spur der Steine bis Cracau. In Volksstimme dated 19 March 2005.
 Friedemann Krusche: Theater in Magdeburg. 2 volumes.

References

External links 
 Magdeburg: Stadttheater (old) andreas-praefcke.de

Former theatres in Germany
Culture of Saxony-Anhalt
Buildings and structures completed in 1876
Buildings and structures demolished in 1944